The following highways are numbered 623:

Costa Rica
 National Route 623

United States